Serge Afanasyan (13 January 1913 – 30 May 1994) was an Armenian historian. He was born in Baku. He wrote about the political evolution of the three Caucasian republics - Armenia, Azerbaijan and Georgia - and in particular the story of their brief independence before the establishment of the Soviet regime (i.e. between the years 1917 and 1923). His works include L'Armenie, l'Azerbaidjan et la Georgie: De l'independance a l'instauration du pouvoir sovietique, 1917-1923 and La Victoire de Sardarabad : Arménie, mai 1918.

References

20th-century Armenian historians
1913 births
1994 deaths
Soviet historians